Quadrille is a card game that was highly popular in the 17th and 18th centuries at the French court and among the British nobility, especially women. A variant of the three-player, Spanish card game Ombre, it is played by four players, both in varying alliances and solo games, using a pack of 40 cards (the 8's, 9's and 10's being removed). By the mid-19th century, Quadrille had fallen out of fashion, superseded by Whist and Boston.

History and Culture 
The novel Pride and Prejudice includes four references to Quadrille being played by an upper class character, Lady Catherine de Bourgh, and her guests. In the Diary of Thomas Vernon, which was written by a loyalist from Newport, Rhode Island, during the American Revolution in 1776, the author mentions playing quadrille frequently during the war while exiled in Glocester, Rhode Island. It is also frequently mentioned in The Diary of a Country Parson 1758-1802 kept by James Woodforde, edited by John Beresford. In Ireland, it was extremely popular in the 1730s. A pamphlet written in  Dublin in 1736, supposedly proposing new rules for the game, caused uproar when it became clear that it was simply a pretext for a vicious attack by the author, Archbishop Josiah Hort, on his enemy Richard Bettesworth MP.

References 

18th-century card games
Ombre group
Four-player card games